Newport High School is a diminutive, rural, public high school located in Newport, Pennsylvania. It is part of the Newport School District. Newport High School serves the borough of Newport; Buffalo Township, Howe Township, Juniata Township, Miller Township, and Oliver Township. In 2016, there were 311 pupils in 9th through 12th grades.

Extracurriculars
Newport Schools offer a full range of extracurricular activities, including: sports, band and orchestra, chorus, and a wide variety of clubs and organizations. The athletic stadium is named after George Katchmer who coached the school to its only undefeated season in 1953.  There is a Buffalo pattern made from rocks displayed proudly behind the field. 
Newport School District has an athletic partnership with the Greenwood High School for football, track, soccer, and wrestling.
The district funds:
Varsity

Boys
Baseball - A
Basketball- AA
Football - AA
Golf - AA
Wrestling - AA

Girls
Basketball - A
Cheer - AAAA
Field hockey - AA
Golf - AA
Softball - A

According to PIAA directory July 2013

References

External links
Official site
Newport School District site
Facebook Group Alumni Page
Newport School District Wikipedia Site

Public high schools in Pennsylvania
Education in Harrisburg, Pennsylvania
High schools in Central Pennsylvania
Susquehanna Valley
Schools in Perry County, Pennsylvania